Bahramabad-e Olya (also Romanized as Bahrāmābād-e ‘Olyā; also known as Bahrāmābād-e Bālā) is a village in Zhan Rural District, in the Central District of Dorud County, Lorestan Province, Iran. At the 2006 census, its population was 926, in 187 families.

References 

Towns and villages in Dorud County